Shantou South railway station is a planned railway station in Longhu District, Shantou, Guangdong, China. It will be an intermediate stop on the Shantou–Shanwei high-speed railway.

Layout
The station is expected to have two side platforms and a bypass line in either direction.

See also
Shantou railway station

References

Railway stations in Guangdong